"Lay Down Sally" is a song performed by Eric Clapton, and written by Clapton, Marcy Levy, and George Terry. It appeared on his November 1977 album Slowhand, and reached No. 3 on the Billboard Hot 100 chart.

Background
"Lay Down Sally" is a country blues song performed in the style of J. J. Cale. Clapton also attributed other members of his band – Carl Radle of Oklahoma, George Terry, Jamie Oldaker and others – as influencing the song. Clapton explained, "It's as close as I can get, being English, but the band being a Tulsa band, they play like that naturally. You couldn't get them to do an English rock sound, no way. Their idea of a driving beat isn't being loud or anything. It's subtle."

Billboard magazine described Clapton's vocal as "low key but earthy" and also praised Marcy Levy's backing vocals.  Cash Box praised Clapton's "guitar finesse."

The single was a crossover country music hit, reaching No. 26 in April 1978, Clapton's best showing on the Hot Country Songs chart. "Lay Down Sally" was a significant part of the soundtrack of the 2013 film August: Osage County, in which the song was played as the intro music and twice more later in the film.

Personnel

 Eric Clapton – electric guitars, vocals
 Marcy Levy – backing vocals
 Yvonne Elliman – backing vocals
 George Terry – electric guitar
 Carl Radle – electric bass
  – electric piano
 Jamie Oldaker – drums
 Glyn Johns – Producer

Charts and certifications

Weekly charts

Year-end charts

All-time charts

Certifications

Covers
Red Sovine, a country singer best known for his sentimental recitations and truck-driving songs, recorded a cover version that – save for the mid-song guitar bridge – closely resembled the Clapton original. Sovine's version reached No. 70 on the Billboard Hot Country Singles chart in the summer of 1978, and was the last charting single released in his lifetime.

Jerry Garcia Band covered the song extensively from 1990 to 1995.

Asleep at the Wheel covered the song on their 1995 album The Wheel Keeps on Rollin'''. Their version peaked at number 70 on the RPM'' Country Tracks chart in Canada in 1996.

References

Bibliography

External links
 

1977 songs
1977 singles
Eric Clapton songs
Songs written by Eric Clapton
Asleep at the Wheel songs
Song recordings produced by Glyn Johns
RSO Records singles